New Guinea, lying within the tropics and with extensive mountain areas, comprises a wide range of ecoregions. These include rainforests, grasslands and mangrove.

Terrestrial ecoregions
New Guinea is in the Australasian realm, which also includes the islands of Wallacea to the west, the Bismarck Archipelago, Solomon Islands, and Vanuatu to the east, and Australia and New Zealand.

Sea levels were lower during the Ice Ages, which exposed the shallow continental shelf and connected New Guinea to Australia into a single land mass. Several nearby islands, including the Aru Islands, most of the Raja Ampat Islands, and Yapen, were also connected to the mainland, which allowed the flora and fauna of New Guinea and the continental shelf islands to mix.

Tropical and subtropical moist broadleaf forests

Central Range montane rain forests
Huon Peninsula montane rain forests
Northern New Guinea lowland rain and freshwater swamp forests
Northern New Guinea montane rain forests
Southeastern Papuan rain forests
Southern New Guinea freshwater swamp forests
Southern New Guinea lowland rain forests
Vogelkop–Aru lowland rain forests
Vogelkop montane rain forests

Tropical and subtropical grasslands, savannas, and shrublands
Trans-Fly savanna and grasslands

Montane grasslands and shrublands
Central Range sub-alpine grasslands

Mangrove
New Guinea mangroves

Freshwater ecoregions
 Vogelkop–Bomberai
 New Guinea North Coast
 New Guinea Central Mountains
 Southwest New Guinea - Trans-Fly Lowland
 Papuan Peninsula

Marine ecoregions
The oceans around New Guinea are part of the Central Indo-Pacific marine realm. The realm is divided into marine provinces, which are further divided into marine ecoregions.
 Western Coral Triangle province
 Papua
 Eastern Coral Triangle province
 Bismarck Sea
 Solomon Sea
 Southeast Papua New Guinea
Sahul Shelf province
 Gulf of Papua
 Arafura Sea

See also
Fauna of New Guinea

References

 Robin Abell, Michele L. Thieme et al. (2008). "Freshwater Ecoregions of the World: A New Map of Biogeographic Units for Freshwater Biodiversity Conservation". BioScience, Volume 58, Issue 5, May 2008, Pages 403–414, https://doi.org/10.1641/B580507

 
Natural history of New Guinea

New Guinea

Natural history of Papua New Guinea
New Guinea